Peter Johansson may refer to:

 Peter Johansson (figure skater) (born 1967), Swedish figure skater
 Peter Johansson (Swedish footballer) (born 1955), Swedish footballer
 Peter Johansson (Danish footballer)
 Peter Johansson (motorcyclist), Swedish Grand Prix motocross racer
 Peter Johansson (musician) (born 1977), Swedish singer, guitarist, dancer and musical artist
 Peter Friis Johansson (born 1983), Swedish classical pianist

See also
 Pete Johansen (born 1962), Norwegian violinist